Koçi Xoxe (pronounced ; 1 May 1911 – 11 June 1949) was an Albanian politician who served as Deputy Prime Minister and Minister of the Interior of the People's Socialist Republic of Albania. He was supported by Yugoslav leader Josip Broz Tito during efforts to bring Albania into the Yugoslav federation. After Albania's leader, Enver Hoxha, established the country's independence with the support of the Soviet Union, Xoxe was arrested, tortured and executed.

Life
Xoxe was born in 1911 in Negovan, near Florina in Greece, back then part of the Manastir Vilayet of the Ottoman Empire. Negovan (today Flampouro/) had a majority of Orthodox Albanians, many of whom sided with the Ecumenical Patriarchate of Constantinople, and a minority of Aromanians (Vlachs). According to some sources, Xoxe was an ethnic Macedonian or ethnic Bulgarian from Aegean Macedonia and was initially a tinsmith.

Around 1937 he emerged among others, such as Enver Hoxha and Koço Tashko, as prominent communists of Albania.

In the post-World War II era, Yugoslav leader Josip Broz Tito sought to exert his country’s influence over Albania through military support to Hoxha in an attempt to absorb Albania. Xoxe, who headed the Ministry of the Interior and the secret police, the Sigurimi, was supported by Tito. Josef Stalin reportedly told Milovan Đilas, a leading figure in Yugoslavia, that Yugoslavia should “swallow up” Albania.

Hoxha began to fear Xoxe as a rival to his own power. After Xoxe ordered the arrest of moderates with anti-Yugoslav sentiments, including Sejfulla Malëshova, Tito attacked Hoxha in a letter to the Albanian Politburo. Hoxha responded by traveling to Moscow with Nako Spiru and returned with a formal trade agreement with the Soviet Union without consulting Tito. 

Tito began to develop a more assertive policy towards the Soviets, which angered Stalin. Over time, Stalin began to side with Albania as a supportive bulwark against Tito. The Soviet Union began to increase Moscow’s presence in the country, spending specialists in mining and oil refining. Xoxe accused Spiru of subversion and, eventually, Spiru was found dead of a gunshot wound in his apartment under suspicious circumstances.

Tito planned to send two army divisions into Albania under the pretense of protecting it from a Greek invasion, a move that angered Moscow. He then pushed Xoxe to convene a meeting of the Central Committee where he expelled Hoxha’s supporters and pushed a motion to combine Albania’s economy and military with Yugoslavia’s. Hoxha fought back with Soviet support and cancelled his agreements with Yugoslavia and expelled the country’s advisors. Xoxe attempted to save himself by declaring his support for the Soviet Union and arresting supporters of Tito in the government. The Central Committee, however, flipped on Xoxe, stripping him of his posts and expelling him from the party. In November 1948, he and many others were arrested.

The Soviets wanted to paint Tito as the mastermind of anti-Marxist and anti-Albanian activities with the trials of Xoxe and the others. Xoxe was tortured in prison repeatedly until he confessed to conspiring with Tito against the Albanian government. In May 1949, he was placed on trial where he confessed to having been recruited by Ahmet Zogu, as well as British intelligence and that Tito was an agent of the west. Xoxe was sentenced to death and was hanged on June 11, 1949.

References

External links 
 Miranda Vickers, James Pettifer, Albania: from anarchy to a Balkan identity, C. Hurst & Co. Publishers, 1997.
 Owen Pearson, Albania in the twentieth century: a history, I. B. Tauris, 2004, volume 3.
 Karen Dawisha, Bruce Parrott, Politics, power, and the struggle for democracy in South-East Europe, Cambridge University Press, 1997.

1911 births
1949 deaths
Albanian communists
Executed politicians
Albanian people executed by the communist regime
People executed by Albania by hanging
Slavic speakers of Greek Macedonia
Government ministers of Albania
Deputy Prime Ministers of Albania
Interior ministers of Albania
Directors of the Sigurimi
People from Manastir vilayet
Albanian people of Bulgarian descent
Albanian people of Macedonian descent
Prosecutors general of Albania
People from Perasma